Guus Hupperts (born 25 April 1992) is a Dutch professional footballer. He formerly played for Roda JC Kerkrade, AZ, Willem II, Sporting Lokeren and VVV-Venlo.

External links
 Voetbal International profile 

1992 births
Living people
People from Heerlen
Association football wingers
Dutch footballers
Netherlands under-21 international footballers
Dutch expatriate footballers
Eredivisie players
Belgian Pro League players
Eerste Divisie players
Roda JC Kerkrade players
AZ Alkmaar players
Willem II (football club) players
K.S.C. Lokeren Oost-Vlaanderen players
VVV-Venlo players
Expatriate footballers in Belgium
Footballers from Limburg (Netherlands)